Your Man may refer to:

 Your Man (album), by Josh Turner, 2006
 "Your Man" (Josh Turner song), 2005
 "Your Man" (Down with Webster song), 2010
 "Your Man", a song by Joji from Nectar, 2020
 "Your Man", a song by Ocean Drive, 2009
 "Your Man", a song by Smash Mouth from Smash Mouth, 2001